Manningham is a ward in the metropolitan borough of the City of Bradford, West Yorkshire, England.  It contains 76 listed buildings that are recorded in the National Heritage List for England.  Of these, one is listed at Grade II*, the middle of the three grades, and the others are at Grade II, the lowest grade.  The ward is to the northwest of the centre of Bradford, and is mainly residential, with some industry at the southern extremity of the ward.  The listed industrial buildings are, or have been, part of the textile industry of the city.  The listed residential buildings range from converted farmhouses and farm buildings, to terraces of houses and cottages, and to large villas.  To the north of the ward are Bradford Grammar School, and part of Lister Park, and both contain listed buildings.  The other listed buildings include churches, mosques and a synagogue, public houses, some or which have been converted for other uses, a group of almshouses and associated structures, a former police station, a hospital, schools, swimming baths, and a war memorial.


Key

Buildings

References

Citations

Sources

 

Lists of listed buildings in West Yorkshire
Listed